Nessa Diab, known mononymously as Nessa, is an American radio and TV personality and television host.

Early life and education 
Nessa was born to an Egyptian father and mother.  She has two brothers. She grew up in Southern California but her dad's job frequently moved her family between California and Saudi Arabia. She graduated with a degree in mass communications from the University of California, Berkeley.

Career 
While in college, Nessa interned at San Francisco Bay Area Top 40 station Wild 94.9. Eventually, she got her own show, "The Baydestrian Report," which covered news in the Bay Area.

She first rose to prominence for her artist and celebrity interviews on Wild 94.9 and YouTube, which led to MTV seeking her out to be on Girl Code. She has also hosted various MTV and MTV2 shows. She currently hosts "Nessa on Air," a successful hip-hop show during the drive time shift on New York City's top rated Hot 97. Her show is the #1 hip hop show in the afternoons with 18–34 year olds and is syndicated nationally in over 15 markets. In 2018, Nessa became the host of NBCUniversal's show, Talk Stoop for one season

Activism 
Nessa and Colin Kaepernick founded Know Your Rights Camp, a multi-city traveling youth empowerment initiative for disadvantaged youth. In 2020, the organization expanded its reach with funds for COVID-19 and in June the creation of a legal defense initiative "for victims of excessive force by police terrorism and civil rights violations."

In 2016, she led Plan B One Step's Perfectly Imperfect national campaign with her Girl Code co-host Carly Aquilino, encouraging young women to take charge of their reproductive health.

New York City youth organizations 
She hosts a yearly prom pamper party for underprivileged high school girls from New York City centered around female empowerment. She mentors students from various organizations in New York City, including the Dream Charter School in Harlem and the Bronx, and she created a scholarship and mentorship program in March 2018 at the Lower East Side Girls Club.

Personal life 
She gave birth to her first child in August 2022 with Colin Kaepernick.

Hosting credits

References

External links
 

Living people
American radio DJs
Television personalities from California
American television talk show hosts
American people of Egyptian descent
American women television personalities
University of California, Berkeley alumni
Year of birth missing (living people)